Ardekania farsella is a species of snout moth in the genus Ardekania. It was described by Hans Georg Amsel in 1951. It is found in Iran.

References

Moths described in 1951
Anerastiini
Moths of Asia
Taxa named by Hans Georg Amsel